The Enemy Within may refer to:

Books
 The Enemy Within (Kennedy book), by Robert F. Kennedy, 1960
 The Enemy Within (play), by Brian Friel, 1962
 The Enemy Within, 1986 Volume 3 of L. Ron Hubbard's Mission Earth series
 The Enemy Within (Milne book), by Seumas Milne, 1994 
 The Enemy Within (novel), by Christie Golden, 1994
 The Enemy Within (Savage book), by Michael Savage, 2003
 Hitman: Enemy Within, a 2007 novelization of the video game Hitman
 The Enemy Within: Terror, Lies, and the Whitewashing of Omar Khadr by Ezra Levant, 2011
 The Enemy Within (Rusch novel), by Kristine Kathryn Rusch, 2014
Enemies Within: Communists, the Cambridge Spies and the Making of Modern Britain by Richard Davenport-Hines, 2018
The Enemy Within: How the ANC lost the battle against corruption by Mpumelelo Mkhabela, 2022.

Film
 The Enemy Within (1918 film), a 1918 Australian silent film
 The Enemy Within (1994 film), an HBO thriller starring Forest Whitaker
 Doctor Who: The Enemy Within (1996 film), FOX TV network telefilm
 The Enemy Within (2013 film), a 2013 Greek film

Music
 "The Enemy Within" (Rush song), 1984
 Enemy Within (album), a 1986 album by Chris Spedding
 "Enemy Within", a 1989 song by D.R.I. from Thrash Zone
 "The Enemy Within", a 1996 song by Cherry Poppin' Daddies from Kids on the Street
 The Enemy Within, a 1998 album by Concord Dawn
 "Enemy Within", a 2001 song by Arch Enemy from Wages of Sin

Television
 Doctor Who (film), a 1996 television movie based on the British science fiction series Doctor Who, alternatively titled Enemy Within
 The Enemy Within (TV series), a 2019 American television series

Episodes
 "The Enemy Within" (Star Trek: The Original Series), 1966
 "The Enemy Within" (MacGyver), 1986
 "The Enemy Within" (Stargate SG-1), 1997
 "Enemy Within" (Law & Order: Criminal Intent), 2001
 "The Enemy Within" (NCIS), 2015
 "The Enemy Within" (Under the Dome), 2015

Other
 The Enemy Within Campaign, a 1986 series of adventures for Warhammer Fantasy Roleplay
 "The Enemy Within", a 2002 article by Gore Vidal about the 9/11 attacks
 "The Enemy Within", a 2010 article by Mark Bowden about the Conficker Worm
 "XCOM: Enemy Within", a 2013 expansion pack to the 2012 video game XCOM: Enemy Unknown
 "Batman: The Enemy Within", a 2017 point and click adventure video game developed by Telltale games

See also
 "The Enemy Within the Gates", a 1968 radio and television episode of Dad's Army
 The Enemy Inside (disambiguation)
 Fifth column
 Internal enemy